Bugden is an Anglo-Saxon surname originating in Huntingdonshire or West Yorkshire around 1086 c.e.

People named Bugden
Bob Bugden (b. 1936), Australian rugby league footballer
Geoff Bugden (b. 1960), Australian rugby league footballer
Mark Bugden (b. 1961), Australian rugby league footballer
Paddy Bugden (1920–1993), Australian rugby league footballer
Patrick Bugden (1897–1917), Australian Victoria Cross recipient

References

English-language surnames